The National Museum of Racing Hall of Fame Stakes is a Grade II American Thoroughbred horse race for three year old horses run over a distance of one mile on the turf held annually in July  at Saratoga Race Course in Saratoga Springs, New York.

History

The event was inaugurated as the Gallant Man Stakes in honor of the U.S. Racing Hall of Fame horse, Gallant Man, on 17 August 1985 as the sixth event in the under-card for Travers Stakes Day and was won by Duluth who was ridden by Jean Cruguet easily by  lengths in a time of 1:47.

The event was upgraded to Grade III in 1987.

In 1992 the event was renamed to the National Museum of Racing Hall of Fame Stakes. National Museum of Racing opened in Saratoga Springs in 1951. In 1955, the Museum moved to its present site on Union Avenue, across the street from Saratoga Race Course. That year, 1992, the event was upgraded to Grade II and held that class since except for 2013 when the race was moved from the turf track to the dirt track due to the state of the track and subsequently was downgraded to Grade III.

The event has been run over several distances, including a mile and an eighth from 1985 to 1995,  a mile and a sixteenth in 1996 and 1997 and in 1998, the distance was changed back to a mile and an eighth. In 2019 the event was held over a mile.

Several three-year-olds who won this event went on to prove themselves as champions. Of these include 1992 winner Paradise Creek who in 1994 became US Champion Male Turf Horse. The 2004 winner Artie Schiller won the 2005 Breeders' Cup Mile after failing in 2004. The 2011 winner Big Blue Kitten also became 2015 US Champion Male Turf Horse and 2017 winner Bricks and Mortar who was voted US Horse of the Year in 2019.

In 2020 the event was run over  miles and the following year was reverted back to one mile.

Records
Speed  record:
 miles:  1:45.90 – Courageous Cat (2009)
 miles: 1:39.47 – Bricks and Mortar (2017)

Margins:
  lengths – Duluth (1985)

Most wins by a jockey:
 7 – Jerry D. Bailey (1986, 1988, 1996, 1997, 1999, 2001, 2003)

Most wins by a trainer:
 7 – William I. Mott (1996, 1999, 2001, 2003, 2006, 2009, 2019)

Most wins by an owner:
 3 – Klaravich Stables (2015, 2019, 2021)

Winners

Legend:

 
 

Notes:

§ Ran as an entry

See also 
 List of American and Canadian Graded races

References

Graded stakes races in the United States
Flat horse races for three-year-olds
Horse races in New York (state)
Turf races in the United States
Saratoga Race Course
Recurring sporting events established in 1985
1985 establishments in New York (state)
Grade 2 stakes races in the United States